The American Journal of Clinical Oncology is a bimonthly, peer-reviewed, scientific, oncology journal, published by Lippincott Williams & Wilkins. The editor in chief is David E. Wazer (Tufts University). The journal was formerly entitled Cancer Clinical Trials.

Aims and scope
The focus of this journal is loco-regional management of cancer. Topical coverage include subjects related to the management of cancer for cancer surgeons, radiation oncologists, medical oncologists, gynecological oncologists, and pediatric oncologists.

Abstracting and indexing 
The following services abstract and index the journal:
Science Citation Index Expanded
Current Contents/Clinical Medicine
BIOSIS Previews

According to the Journal Citation Reports, the journal has a 2014 impact factor of 3.062, ranking it 93rd out of 211 journals in the category "Oncology".

References

Lippincott Williams & Wilkins academic journals
Oncology journals
Publications established in 1978
Bimonthly journals
English-language journals